Sevtap Baycılı is a Dutch writer of Turkish extraction.  Born in Istanbul in 1968, she studied philosophy in Turkey, earning the nickname "Miss Wittgenstein".  She settled in the Netherlands in 1991.

Her first novel, De Markov-keten ("The Markov chain", 1998) is an exploration of the thoughts of a psychiatric patient, obviously influenced by Becket, and with a strong philosophical element.

A second novel,  De nachtmerrie van de allochtoon ("The foreigner's nightmare", 1999) is a satirical, often comical comment on Dutch expectations of the integration of foreigners.

Donderpreken is non-fiction.

Her journalistic work includes the interactive internet column Kip en ei zonder kop ("Chicken and egg without a head"), at Intermediair online.

Three unpublished dramas go by the collective title of Reductio ad absurdum.

In English and Dutch sources, her surname is often written Baycili, for want of the correct Turkish fonts.

References
Graeme Dunphy, "Migrant, Emigrant, Immigrant: Recent Developments in Turkish-Dutch Literature", Neophilologus, 85 (2001) 1-23.
Elma Nap-Kolhoff, Turkse auteurs in Nederland: verkenning van een onontgonnen gebied, 2002.

See also
 Migrant literature

1968 births
20th-century Dutch writers
21st-century Dutch writers
Writers from Istanbul
Turkish emigrants to the Netherlands
Living people
Dutch people of Turkish descent